Clip is a 2012 Serbian drama film written and directed by Maja Miloš, her first time directing, and starring Isidora Simijonović in her first film role. The film's title derives from the many short cell phone videos made by the film's central character, Jasna (Simijonović), a troubled teenager whose family is falling apart. The film was released in Serbia on 12 April 2012 at Belgrade's Sava Centar. Simijonović won the award for the best actress at the Vilnius International Film Festival and 'The Golden Hazelnut' (Zlatni lešnik) award for the best actress at the fifth International Festival of Film Direction in Leskovac.

Cast

Reception
The film holds a rating of 43% on review aggregator website Rotten Tomatoes and a score of 54 on Metacritic.

Controversy
Due to its realistic depiction of sex between minors (Simijonović was 14 when production began), the film was banned in Russia as child pornography. In interviews, Miloš said that prosthetics, dildos, special visual effects, and body doubles had been used, and that the film had a long post-production period.

Accolades
 Rotterdam International Film Festival – KNF Award 2012

References

External links
 
 
 
 

2012 films
2012 drama films
2010s erotic drama films
2010s teen drama films
Films about drugs
Films set in Belgrade
Films shot in Serbia
Juvenile sexuality in films
Serbian drama films
Serbian teen films
Teensploitation
2010s Serbian-language films
Films shot in Belgrade
Censored films